Lanrelas is a commune in the Côtes-d'Armor department of Brittany in northwestern France.

Population

Inhabitants of Lanrelas are called lanrelasiens in French.

See also
Communes of the Côtes-d'Armor department

Notable people
Pierre-Mathurin Gillet (1762-1795), revolutionary politician

References

External links

Official website 

Communes of Côtes-d'Armor